Hünkar Mosque ("Sovereign's Mosque") can refer to:

 Hünkar Mosque, Constanța, in Romania
 Hünkar Mosque, Chania, in Greece
 Hünkar Mosque, Veroia, in Greece
 Hünkar Mosque, Sarajevo, in Bosnia